Cymbidium parishii is a species of orchid.

It was named by Heinrich Gustav Reichenbach in honour of the botanist and plant collector Charles Parish in 1874.

parishii